Tikana Rural LLG is a local government area in New Ireland Province, Papua New Guinea. The LLG administers the northern section of the island of New Ireland, as well as Djaul Island and some Tigak islands in the strait between New Ireland and New Hanover.

The LLG is located in Kavieng District and the LLG headquarters is Kavieng, although Kavieng has its own urban LLG.

Tikana is a portmanteau word derived from the names of the three language areas that make up the LLG: Tigak, Kara and Nalik. Population is 33,222 (PNG Census 2011).

The Kuot language is spoken in the southern part of the LLG.

The LLG president is Ken Bart.

Wards
01. Enang
02. Nonovaul
03. Panapai
04. Kaselok
05. Bagatare
06. Lokono
07. Ngavalus
08. Paruai
09. Lemakot
10. Panamana
11. Madina
12. Kafkaf (Kuot language speakers)
13. Namasalang
14. Belifu
15. Pangeifua
16. Lamusmus
17. Leon
18. Lapai
83. Lakurumau Estate

References

Local-level governments of New Ireland Province